Adema is the debut album by American rock band Adema. It was released on August 21, 2001 through Arista Records and peaked at #27 on the Billboard 200. The album was certified gold by the Recording Industry Association of America (RIAA) on March 6, 2002 for selling over 500,000 copies in the United States, and has since sold over 1 million copies worldwide. The major singles from the album were "The Way You Like It" and "Giving In". "Freaking Out" has also seen some radio airplay. It remains their best-selling album to date.

Track listing

Personnel
Adema
 Mark Chavez – vocals
 Tim Fluckey – lead guitar, backing vocals, keyboards, programming
 Mike Ransom – rhythm guitar
 Dave DeRoo – bass, backing vocals
 Kris Kohls – drums

Production
 Produced and Engineered by Tobias Miller & Bill Appleberry
 Assistant Engineer // Brian Cook /// Recorded at Henson Studios
 Mixed by Alan Moulder
 Assistant Mix Engineer // Tom Stanley
 '*' Mixed by David J. Holman
 Mastered by Dave Collins at Marcussen Mastering
 A&R // Joshua Sarubin
 Management // Terry Lippman Company
 Business Management // Gelfand, Rennert & Feldman
 Legal // Terri L. DiPaolo for Manatt, Phelps & Phillips
 Touring // William Morris Agency, Inc.
 Art Direction & Design // Jeff Schulz
 Photography // Dean Karr
 Styling // Estée Ochoa

Charts

Singles

Certifications

References

Adema albums
2001 debut albums
Arista Records albums